Bultfontein is a suburb of Johannesburg, South Africa, just south of Lanseria. It is located in Region A of the City of Johannesburg Metropolitan Municipality.

References

Johannesburg Region A
Suburbs of Johannesburg